Zviad Burdzenidze (Russian: Звиад Бурдзенидзе; born 14 March 1969) is a Georgian retired footballer.

References

1969 births
Living people
Footballers from Georgia (country)
Association football forwards
FC Lida players
FC Kommunalnik Slonim players
Expatriate footballers from Georgia (country)
Expatriate footballers in Belarus